The .465 H&H Magnum also known as .465 Holland & Holland Magnum, is a modern big bore firearms cartridge introduced by Holland & Holland in 2003 together with the .400 H&H Magnum. The .465 H&H Magnum is a .468 caliber, belted, rimless bottlenecked cartridge. The cartridge is a necked-up, shoulder-lowered tapered cartridge based on the .378 Weatherby Magnum case.

General information
Holland & Holland began receiving requests from potential customers for a cartridge that would provide more power than the .375 H&H Magnum. Holland & Holland director Russell Wilkins undertook the project which culminated in the .400 H&H Magnum and the .465 H&H Magnum cartridge designs. To meet this requirement Holland & Holland chose the .460 Weatherby Magnum case as a starting point in their design.

This .465 H&H Magnum cartridge is not the same as the famous .500/465 Nitro Express also designed by Holland & Holland for "India" double rifles. The .500/465 Nitro Express is the only other cartridge with the same bullet diameter as the .465 H&H Magnum. Both cartridges are designed to fire a  .468 caliber (11.89 mm) bullet. The moderate pressure of the cartridge ensures reliability and safety in the tropical climes in which the cartridge was intended to be used. Furthermore, the taper and shallow shoulder of the cartridge aids in the smooth, reliable feeding and extraction.

The .465 H&H Magnum is an excellent cartridge for all-around game and African dangerous game including the Big 5. It has a similar trajectory to that of the .375 H&H Magnum. It is considered as the best-balanced cartridge for hunting dangerous game in India(this reference was from my late father HE M A Rahman who was referring to the  465 India also known as the 500/465 H & H.

Ammunition for the .465 H&H Magnum is being manufactured by Wolfgang Romey for Holland & Holland.

Specifications
Both .465 H&H Belted Magnum cartridge and chamber specifications were standardized by CIP on 2006-09-19. 

The .465 H&H Magnum is based on the .460 Weatherby Magnum case, itself based on the .378 Weatherby Magnum. The .378 Wea. Mag. was itself based on adding a belt to the .416 Rigby case & giving it a Weatherby double radius shoulder. Holland & Holland took the .460 Weatherby case and moved the shoulder back, creating a longer neck for the cartridge, and increased the body taper of the cartridge to improve feeding reliability. The case is also necked up to accept a .465 caliber (11.65 mm) bullet.

.465 Holland & Holland Magnum cartridge schematic: All dimensions in millimeters [inches].

See also
 Table of handgun and rifle cartridges

References

Pistol and rifle cartridges
Holland & Holland cartridges
British firearm cartridges